Bert Coote (1867–1938) was a British stage actor who also appeared in several films, including the lead role in the 1931 crime film Bracelets.

He is the father of the actor Robert Coote.

Filmography
 Greek Street (1930)
 Such Is the Law (1930)
 Bracelets (1931)
 Two Hearts in Waltz Time (1934)

References

Bibliography
 Low, Rachael. Filmmaking in 1930s Britain. George Allen & Unwin, 1985.
 Parker, John. Who's who in the Theatre. Pitman, 1972.

External links

1867 births
1938 deaths
British male stage actors
British male film actors
Male actors from London
20th-century British male actors